Appignano is a comune (municipality) in the Province of Macerata in the Italian region Marche, located about  southwest of Ancona and about  northwest of Macerata.

Appignano borders the following municipalities: Cingoli, Filottrano, Macerata, Montecassiano, Montefano, Treia.

Sights include the church of San Giovanni.

References

External links
 Official website

Cities and towns in the Marche
Articles which contain graphical timelines